Irada Guliyeva (born 17 December 1973) is an Azerbaijani former footballer who played as a defender. She has been a member of the Azerbaijan women's national team.

See also
List of Azerbaijan women's international footballers

References

1973 births
Living people
Women's association football defenders
Azerbaijani women's footballers
Azerbaijan women's international footballers